Zanclopera is a genus of moths in the family Geometridae described by Warren in 1894.

Species
Zanclopera falcata Warren, 1894 north-eastern Himalayas, southern China, Taiwan, Myanmar, Peninsular Malaysia, Borneo
Zanclopera straminearia Leech, 1897 China

References

Boarmiini